It Is Rocket Science is a BBC Radio 4 comedy about the history and development of human spaceflight, written and performed by Helen Keen. The series also stars Peter Serafinowicz and Susy Kane and is produced by Gareth Edwards. It was first broadcast in March 2011.

The premise of the show is that, lacking a big budget, "award winning comedian and part time local authority temporary administrative assistant"  Keen has built a ‘super computer’ named The Voice of Space to narrate her peculiar but factually accurate history of space travel, and recreate the voices of various of historical and illustrative characters. Throughout the series The Voice of Space is referred to as possessing the attributes/spare parts of various types of vintage home computers (particularly ZX Spectrum, as heard in episode 1) and household kitchen equipment.  Keen has said that The Voice of Space's unique pronunciation of words such as universe (‘oooniverse’) which has drawn comment  is intended as an affectionate tribute to the vocal styling of the presenters of her favourite space themed TV programmes, particularly e.g. Carl Sagan's pronunciation of Cosmos (which sounded unusual to her as an English person).

The radio series is an adaptation of Keen's debut Edinburgh Festival Fringe show, also called It Is Rocket Science, which, when it previewed at the Buxton Fringe 2008 was nominated as Best Show and won the Best Individual Comedy Performer award. The show then embarked on a tour of science and arts festivals throughout the UK and Ireland before being commissioned as a radio series.

A second series was broadcast in May and June 2012, and a third series in April 2014.

Episode lists

First series

Second series

Third series

Awards
In 2013 It Is Rocket Science won the WISE Media Award. This was presented to Helen Keen by Princess Anne in a ceremony at the Science Museum, London. The show was nominated for the 2015 Writers' Guild of Great Britain Award for Best Radio Comedy and won the 2015 Royal Society Radio Prize presented by the Association of British Science Writers.

References

External links

Helen Keen's website

BBC Radio comedy programmes
2011 radio programme debuts